John McLean (September 24, 1846 – February 20, 1936) was a merchant and political figure in Prince Edward Island. He represented King's County in the House of Commons of Canada from 1891 to 1896 as a Conservative member. McLean represented Souris division in the Senate of Canada from 1915 until his death.

He was born in Mount Herbert, the son of Daniel McLean, and was educated at Prince of Wales College. In 1852, he married Matilda Jane Jury. McLean represented 1st Kings in the Legislative Assembly of Prince Edward Island from 1882 to 1891, from 1900 to 1904 and from 1908 to 1915. He was an unsuccessful candidate for the riding of King's in the House of Commons in 1904. He served in the provincial Executive Council as a Minister without Portfolio from 1911 to 1915.

He died in Souris at the age of 89.

His son Harry and his grandson John Robert McLean also served in the provincial assembly.

References 

The Canadian parliamentary companion, 1887 JA Gemmill

1846 births
1936 deaths
People from Queens County, Prince Edward Island
Progressive Conservative Party of Prince Edward Island MLAs
Members of the House of Commons of Canada from Prince Edward Island
Conservative Party of Canada (1867–1942) MPs
Canadian senators from Prince Edward Island